The district of Friedeberg Nm., also called Friedeberger Kreis until the 19th century, was a Prussian district that existed until 1945. It belonged to the Province of Brandenburg until 1938 and then to the Province of Pomerania. The district comprised the three towns of Driesen, Friedeberg and Woldenberg. The district area is now in the Strzelce-Drezdenko County of the Polish Lubusz Voivodeship.

History 

In the late medieval period, the Margraviate of Brandenburg was divided into districts known as Kreise. One of these historical districts was the Friedeberger Kreis or the Friedeberg district, which formed one of the four so-called Hinterkreise in the Neumark.

As part of the establishment of provinces and administrative regions in Prussia, Regierungsbezirk Frankfurt was established in the Province of Brandenburg in 1815, which included the Friedeberg district which had its capital at Friedeberg in der Neumark, abbreviated as Friedeberg Nm.

Since January 1871, the district belonged to the German Reich. On October 1, 1938, the Friedeberg Nm. district was reclassified to the Province of Pomerania and became part of the administrative region Grenzmark Posen-West Prussia.

In the spring of 1945, the district was occupied by the Red Army. After the end of the war, the district was placed under Polish administration by the Soviet Union. The local German population was expelled by the Polish administrative authorities.

Railways 
The Friedeberg district had already been connected to the railway network by the Arnswalde-Kreuz section of the Stargard-Posen Railway Company since 1848. In the following decade, from 1857, the Prussian Eastern Railway, which connected Berlin with East Prussia, crossed the district parallel to the Netze river. However, the Friedeberg station was 7 km away from the town, and therefore a small railway was built to the town in 1897.

In order to bypass the areas that became Polish after 1919, the Deutsche Reichsbahn built the branch line Altbeelitz-Schwerin (Warthe) in 1936.

Municipalities 
In 1945, the district of Friedeberg Nm. contained the following towns and municipalities:

References 

Populated places disestablished in 1945
Friedeberg Nm.
Strzelce-Drezdenko County